Vukan Nemanjić (before 1165 – after 1207) was the Grand Prince of the Grand Principality of Serbia from 1202 to 1204. He was the Grand Prince of Pomorje (titular King) from 1195 until his death. He was the eldest (of three), but his father had instead chosen his younger brother Stefan as heir, as soon as his father died, he plotted against his brother, Stefan II Nemanjić, and took the throne by force, in a coup assisted by the Kingdom of Hungary. He was defeated two years later, and was pardoned by his third brother, who became Saint Sava, and he continued to rule his appanage of Zeta unpunished.

Life
Vukan was born as the eldest son of Serbian Grand Prince Stefan Nemanja (r. 1166-1196) and his wife Anastasija. His younger brothers were Stefan Nemanjić and Rastko Nemanjić, and he also had two sisters.

His father had managed to secure the independence from the Byzantine Empire after the death of emperor Manuel I (1180), and then conquered the traditional fiefs of Duklja, Travunija and Hum on the Adriatic coast. Nemanja gives Vukan, as heir apparent, appanages of the conquered lands, including Hvosno and Toplica around 1190 as Grand Prince.

In an inscription dated 1195 in the church of St. Luke in Kotor, Vukan is titled as King of Duklja, Dalmatia, Travunia, Toplica and Hvosno.

Although Vukan was Nemanja's eldest son, Nemanja preferred to see his younger son Stefan Nemanjić on the Serbian throne mostly because Stefan was married to Byzantine princes Eudocia, daughter of latter emperor Alexios III Angelos. It seems that Vukan reacted on this change in succession by declaring himself King of Duklja in 1195 probably due to the relationship of his family with old Dukljan royal house which was deposed by his father. Although he assumed royal title, Vukan remained to recognize Nemanja's authority. In 1196 at the State Council Nemanja abdicated in favor of Stefan and Vukan had to recognize his brother as the new ruler of Serbia. After the council Nemanja became monk Simeon and retreated to his monastery of Hilandar on holy Mount Athos. While Nemanja was alive Vukan didn't oppose Stefan's rule but as soon as Nemanja died in 1200 he started to plot against him in order to become Grand župan. He found help in Hungarian king Emeric (1196–1204) who at the time fought against the Second Bulgarian Empire and wanted Serbian assistance. With the help of Hungarian troops in 1202, Vukan managed to overthrow Stefan, who fled to Bulgaria, and Vukan was left to rule. In an inscription dating to 1202-1203, Vukan is titled as Grand Župan Vukan, Ruler of all Serbian land, Zeta, maritime towns and land of Nišava.

In return for Hungarian help, Vukan became a Hungarian vassal and promised that he would convert his people to Catholicism if the Pope would give him royal title. However, as a Hungarian vassal, Vukan soon got involved in their conflict with Bulgaria. In 1203 Bulgarians attacked Serbia and conquered the eastern part of country with the city of Niš. In the chaos that followed the Bulgarian attack, and using the Vukans's sympathies for Catholicism against him, Stefan managed to return to Serbia and overthrow Vukan in 1204 becoming grand župan again. On intervention of the third brother, archbishop Sava, Stefan spared Vukan and return him to his apanage in Zeta (Duklja) where he kept his title of king.
He was mentioned for the last time in 1207.  It is believed that he died soon after because his son Đorđe is mentioned as king in 1208. Until the end of his life, Vukan Nemanjić remained a Catholic.

Titles
"Grand Župan Vukan, Ruler of all Serbian lands, Zeta, maritime towns and land of Nišava"
"Vukan, King of Duklja, Dalmatia, Travunia, Toplica and Hvosno", 1195
"Crowned king and autocrat of all Serbian and coastal lands."

Family
Vukan had at least three sons by his wife (it is possible that this woman belonged to the family of the Counts of Segni, the same family as Innocent III):

Đorđe who held title of king in 1208, but was only prince in 1242
Stefan who founded  Morača monastery in 1252
Dmitar (better known by his monastic name David) who founded monastery of Davidovica and was still alive in 1286.
Mladen (Bladinus)

See also 

Nemanjić family tree

Annotations

References

Sources

Further reading
Ruvarac, I. (1888) Vukan najstariji sin Stefana Nemanje i Vukanovići. Godišnjica Nikole Čupića, 10, 1-9
Stanojević, S. (1933) Hronologija borbe između Stevana i Vukana. Glas - Srpska kraljevska akademija / Glas SKA, CLIII, str. 91-101

13th-century Serbian monarchs
13th-century Serbian royalty
Grand Princes of Zeta
12th-century births
13th-century deaths
Roman Catholic monarchs
People of the Grand Principality of Serbia
Serbian Roman Catholics
People associated with Hilandar Monastery